Wiesław Kujda (born 25 November 1955) is a Polish rower. He competed in two events at the 1980 Summer Olympics.

References

1955 births
Living people
Polish male rowers
Olympic rowers of Poland
Rowers at the 1980 Summer Olympics
Rowers from Warsaw